Ronny Harun (born 19 January 1984 in Sipitang, Sabah) is a Malaysian professional footballer who plays  for Petaling Jaya Rangers in the Malaysia FAM League. His primary position is as a left back but he can also play as a centre-back.

Club career
Ronny started his football career with Sabah. He was part of Sabah squad that finished as runners-up in 2002 and 2003 Malaysia Cup.

He also played for Kedah and Terengganu.

On 14 August 2017, he was announced to receive the Best Asian Football Federation Award XI 16 to be held in Bali, Indonesia on 23 September 2017.

International career
Ronny was also the member of Malaysia U-23 team during 2003 until 2006. It was Allan Harris who took Ronny into Malaysia U-23 squad. He played in 2006 Asian Games, 2004 Olympic Games qualifier, 2003 SEA Games and 2005 SEA Games. His biggest achievement with the team is becoming the bronze medalist at the 2003 and 2005 SEA Games.

Ronny has represented the senior team several times.

Honours
Kedah
 Malaysia Premier League: 2006,
 Malaysia Super League: 2006–2007, 2007–2008
 Malaysia FA Cup: 2007, 2008
 Malaysia Cup: 2007, 2008
Terangganu
 Malaysia FA Cup: 2011
Sarawak
 Malaysia Premier League: 2013

Malaysia U-23
 Southeast Asian Games: Bronze medals 2003 and 2005

Individual
 2016 AFF Championship: Best Eleven
 ASEAN Football Federation Best XI: 2017'''

References

External links
 
 

1984 births
Living people
People from Sabah
Malaysian footballers
Malaysia international footballers
Sabah F.C. (Malaysia) players
Kedah Darul Aman F.C. players
Terengganu FC players
Sarawak FA players
Malaysia Super League players
Association football defenders
Footballers at the 2006 Asian Games
Asian Games competitors for Malaysia